Tim Stevenson (born 1945) is a Canadian politician and United Church minister. He served as councillor on the Vancouver City Council, 2002 to 2018 as a member of Vision Vancouver. He was a founding member of Vision Vancouver.

Background

Stevenson received a B.A. from the University of British Columbia, a M.A., Spirituality from Holy Names College in Oakland, California where he studied with Matthew Fox and a M.Div from the Vancouver School of Theology. In 1992 he was ordained by the British Columbia Conference of the United Church of Canada. Stevenson was the first openly gay person to be ordained in Canada. In 1993 he began his ministry at St. Paul's United Church in Burnaby. He also served as a board member at the First United Church in the Downtown Eastside for 10 years.

Stevenson has worked in the Philippines and South Africa. In 1991 he was a Canadian representative at the African National Congress Conference in Durban when Nelson Mandela was elected ANC party president. In 1994 he was an international observer in South Africa's first election after the fall of apartheid. Also in South Africa he has worked with the Black Liberation Gay and Lesbian Movement and other organizations that focus on social injustices.

Political career

In the 1996 Provincial election he was elected in Vancouver-Burrard to the Legislative Assembly of British Columbia as a member of the British Columbia New Democratic Party. He was the first openly gay MLA elected in British Columbia. He served as Parliamentary Secretary to the Minister of Health as well as the deputy speaker of the House. Between 2000 and 2001 he held a cabinet position as Minister for Employment and Investment. He was the first openly gay cabinet minister (either provincial or federal) in Canada. He lost his provincial seat in 2001 to Lorne Mayencourt of the B.C. Liberals.

In 2002 he was elected to the Vancouver City Council in British Columbia. As a member of the city council and board member of Tourism Vancouver, he is known for modernizing Vancouver's entertainment and tourism industry. When gay marriage became legalized in British Columbia, Stevenson performed the first legal gay weddings in the province. In 2014 Stevenson represented the city of Vancouver as deputy mayor at the Sochi Olympics. He met with the President's Office of the International Olympics Committee urging them to add "sexual orientation" to the Olympic Charter. They subsequently did so.

Stevenson was a candidate in the 2005 provincial election, again in Vancouver-Burrard. Conflicting results throughout election night had both Stevenson and Mayencourt declared the victor at different times, and the uncertainty continued for several weeks. In the official count of regular ballots, Stevenson was declared the winner by 17 votes. However, when absentee ballots were counted on May 30, 2005, Mayencourt was declared the winner by a margin of 18 votes. After a judicial recount, Mayencourt was declared the victor by 11 votes.

Stevenson won re-election as a city councillor in the 2005 Vancouver municipal election as a member of Vision Vancouver, and again in the 2008 election and the 2011 election.

Personal
Stevenson's spouse for 14 years has been Gary Paterson, another minister and former moderator of the United Church of Canada. Same sex marriage in Canada is legal, and Stevenson and Paterson were legally married in 2004.

Electoral record

References

External links
 Tim Stevenson at Vancouver City Council

British Columbia New Democratic Party MLAs
Canadian clergy
LGBT Protestant clergy
Gay politicians
Canadian LGBT people in provincial and territorial legislatures
Ministers of the United Church of Canada
Vision Vancouver councillors
Living people
Holy Names University alumni
LGBT municipal councillors in Canada
1945 births
Members of the Executive Council of British Columbia
20th-century Canadian politicians
21st-century Canadian politicians
21st-century Canadian LGBT people
20th-century Canadian LGBT people
Canadian gay men